William José Martínez (born January 4, 1978) is a Venezuelan former relief pitcher in Major League Baseball who played for the Cleveland Indians in the 2000 season. Listed at 6' 2", 180 lb., Martínez batted and threw right-handed. He was born in Barquisimeto, Lara.

Martinez  belongs to a group of ballplayers who at least secured a cup of coffee in the majors. He appeared in just one game with the Indians, allowing one earned run on one hit and one walk, striking out one hitter in three innings of work and did not have a decision.

See also
 List of Major League Baseball players from Venezuela

References

External links

1978 births
Living people
Akron Aeros players
Buffalo Bisons (minor league) players
Burlington Indians players (1986–2006)
Caribes de Anzoátegui players
Chattanooga Lookouts players
Cleveland Indians players
Edmonton Trappers players
Kinston Indians players
Major League Baseball pitchers
Major League Baseball players from Venezuela
Sportspeople from Barquisimeto
Tiburones de La Guaira players
Watertown Indians players
Venezuelan expatriate baseball players in Canada
Venezuelan expatriate baseball players in the United States